The voiced retroflex plosive or stop is a type of consonantal sound, used in some spoken languages. Like all the retroflex consonants, the IPA symbol is formed by adding a rightward-pointing hook extending from the bottom of a d, the letter that is used for the corresponding alveolar consonant. Many South Asian languages, such as Hindi and Urdu, have a two-way contrast between plain and murmured (breathy voice) .

Features

Features of the voiced retroflex stop:

Occurrence

See also
 African D
 Index of phonetics articles

Notes

References

External links
 

Retroflex consonants
Plosives
Pulmonic consonants
Voiced oral consonants
Central consonants